Samuel Bostwick Garvin (October 8, 1811 – June 28, 1878) was an American lawyer and politician from New York.

Personal life and history
Garvin was born in Butternuts, Oswego County, New York.

He studied law, was admitted to the bar, and commenced practice in Norwich (Chenango Co.). On January 14, 1836, he married Julia Maria Mitchell; the daughter of Henry Mitchell (New York politician) and Rowena Wales.

In 1840, he removed to Utica and continued the practice of law there. He was District Attorney of Oneida County from 1851 to 1853.

In June 1853, he was appointed by President Franklin Pierce U.S. Attorney for the Northern District of New York, and remained in office until 1857. Afterwards he resumed the practice of law in New York City.

In 1859, D.A. Nelson J. Waterbury appointed him an Assistant New York County District Attorney. In 1863, Garvin was elected to the New York City Superior Court. He was a delegate to the New York State Constitutional Convention of 1867-68.

In January 1869, he resigned from the bench to accept his appointment by Gov. John T. Hoffman as New York County D.A. to fill the vacancy caused by the resignation of A. Oakey Hall who took office as Mayor of New York City. In November 1869, Garvin was elected on the Democratic ticket to succeed himself for a full term. In 1869, he prosecuted Daniel McFarland for the murder of Albert D. Richardson, but McFarland was acquitted.

He died of apoplexy in New York City, at his residence at the Hotel Royal, located on the corner of Sixth Avenue and 42nd Street.

Sources
The New York Civil List compiled by Franklin Benjamin Hough, Stephen C. Hutchins and Edgar Albert Werner (1867; page 531)
Genealogy of the Bostwick Family in America
LATEST INTELLIGENCE in NYT on June 9, 1853
POLITICAL.; THE ELECTION TO-MORROW in NYT on November 1, 1869
OBITUARY.; SAMUEL B. GARVIN in NYT on June 29, 1878

Note: 

1811 births
1878 deaths
New York County District Attorneys
People from Butternuts, New York
People from Norwich, New York
United States Attorneys for the Northern District of New York
19th-century American politicians